The Havel is a river in Germany.

Havel or Havell may also refer to:

People

People with the given name
 Havel of Markvartice (flourished 1230–1280), prominent Czech nobleman
 Havel Medek of Valdek (died 1410), Bohemian noble
 Havel Rowe (1928–2019), Australian rules footballer

People with the surname
 Havell family, an English family which produced notable engravers, etchers and painters, as well as writers, publishers, educators and musicians
 Daniel Havel, Czech sprint canoeist
 Ernest Binfield Havell (1861–1934), English arts administrator, art historian and author
 Gustav Havel (born 1930), Czech former Grand Prix motorcycle road racer
 Hippolyte Havel (1871–1950), Czech anarchist
 Jan Havel, Czech ice hockey player
 Joseph Havel (born 1954), modernist American sculptor
 Lukáš Havel (born 1981), Czech professional ice hockey player
 Milan Havel, Czech footballer
 Miloš Havel (1899–1968), Czech film producer and studio executive
 Miroslav Havel (designer) (1922–2008), Czech-born chief designer for Waterford Crystal
 Paul Havell (born 1980), Australian-born English cricketer
 Radek Havel (ice hockey) (born 1994), Czech ice hockey player
 Radek Havel (swimmer) (born 1961), Czech swimmer
 Václav Havel (1936–2011), last president of Czechoslovakia and first president of the Czech Republic
 Václav Havel (canoeist) (1920–1979), Czech canoeist
 William Havell (1782–1857), English landscape painter

Other uses
 Havel Canal, a canal in the German state of Brandenburg
 Havel (film), a 2020 Czech historical film about Václav Havel

See also 
 Haval (disambiguation)
 Elbe–Havel Canal
 Oder–Havel Canal

Czech-language surnames